The France women's national under-17 football team is a youth football team that represents France at UEFA Women's Under-17 Championship and U-17 Women's World Cup tournaments. They were the first non-Asian country to win a U-17 Women's World Cup in 2012.

Fixtures and results
Legend

2022

Players

Previous squads
2008 FIFA U-17 Women's World Cup
2012 FIFA U-17 Women's World Cup

Competitive record

FIFA U-17 Women's World Cup

The French team has participated in 2 tournaments. Their best result was winner (2012)

UEFA Women's Under-17 Championship

The French team has participated in seven of the twelve UEFA Women's Under-17 Championship. His best result was runners-up (2008, 2011, 2012).

See also
 France women's national football team
 France women's national under-19 football team
 FIFA U-17 Women's World Cup
 UEFA Women's Under-17 Championship

References

Women's national under-17 association football teams
under
European women's national under-17 association football teams